The Z Bend lookout is a  popular tourist lookout on the Murchison River Gorge in Western Australia. One of four lookouts in the national park, it is situated on a sharp bend in the gorge.

Facilities
Picnic seating and toilets are situated next to the car park.

References

Tourist attractions in Western Australia
Landforms of Western Australia